Gianna Ursula Woodruff Washington (born November 18, 1993) is a Panamanian track and field athlete specializing in the 400 metres hurdles. She represented her country at the delayed 2020 Tokyo Olympics improving her own South American record with a time of 54.22 seconds in the semi-finals to finish 7th in the final.

In 2017, Woodruff reached the semi-finals at the World Championships.

Born in Santa Monica, California, she has a dual citizenship with the United States and Panama. Her sister, Yasmin Woodruff, is a sprinter.

International competitions

Personal bests
All information taken from World Athletics profile.

 200 metres – 23.88 (+1.4 m/s, Irvine, CA 2018)
 400 metres – 52.78 (Austin, TX 2021) 
 400 metres hurdles – 53.69 (Eugene 2022)
Indoor
 60 metres – 7.65 (Seattle, WA 2015)
 200 metres – 24.67 (Albuquerque, NM 2014)
 400 metres – 57.17 (Portland, OR 2016)

References

1993 births
Living people
Sportspeople from Santa Monica, California
Track and field athletes from California
Panamanian female hurdlers
World Athletics Championships athletes for Panama
American sportspeople of Panamanian descent
People with acquired Panamanian citizenship
Washington Huskies women's track and field athletes
Competitors at the 2018 Central American and Caribbean Games
Athletes (track and field) at the 2018 South American Games
South American Games bronze medalists for Panama
South American Games medalists in athletics
Central American Games gold medalists for Panama
Central American Games medalists in athletics
Central American Games silver medalists for Panama
Athletes (track and field) at the 2019 Pan American Games
Pan American Games competitors for Panama
Athletes (track and field) at the 2020 Summer Olympics
Olympic athletes of Panama
21st-century Panamanian women